Duan Zhigui (1869 – March 1925) was a Chinese general. Born in Hefei, Anhui, he attained the post of Heilongjiang governor in the late Qing dynasty and between 1912-13 was governor of Chahar and the military governor of Hubei between 1914–15, as well as military and civil governor of Fengtian in 1915-16.

A staunch supporter of Yuan Shikai, he was nicknamed the "Adopted Prince", and when Duan Qirui, a fellow Hefei native, took the Beijing government in 1917, Duan was made a Minister of War; however, with Duan Qirui's defeat by 1920, Duan Zhigui fled to the Japanese embassy. He was remitted in 1922 and lived in Tianjin until his death there in 1925.

References

External links
 Tuan Chi-kwei (Duan Zhigui) 段芝貴 from Biographies of Prominent Chinese c.1925.

1869 births
1925 deaths
Politicians from Hefei
Qing dynasty generals
Republic of China warlords from Anhui
Chinese police officers
Governors of Heilongjiang
Viceroys of Huguang
Members of the Anhui clique
Empire of China (1915–1916)